Year in topic Year 1015 (MXV) was a common year starting on Saturday (link will display the full calendar) of the Julian calendar.

Events 
 By place 

 Asia 
 October – Influential Japanese statesman Fujiwara no Michinaga is appointed to be Associate Regent.
 November – The newly constructed Japanese imperial residence burns down.
 Peacocks arrive from the Chinese Song Empire to Fujiwara's mansion in Japan.

 Europe 
 July 15 – Vladimir the Great dies at Berestove after a 35-year reign. He is succeeded by his son Sviatopolk I as Grand Prince of Kiev.
 Summer – King Cnut the Great of Denmark launches an invasion of Mercia and Northumbria in England.
 Emperor Henry II launches a German expedition against Duke Bolesław I the Brave. He invades Poland but is stopped by Bolesław's forces at Krosno on the Oder river. 
 Earl Eric Haakonsson outlaws berserkers in Norway.
 Olaf Haraldsson declares himself King of Norway.

Births 
 Andrew I ("the Catholic"), king of Hungary (d. 1060)
 Altmann, bishop of Passau (approximate date)
 Ermesinda of Bigorre, queen of Aragon (d. 1049)
 Eustace II, count of Boulogne (approximate date)
 Ferdinand I, king of León and Castile (d. 1065)
 Frozza Orseolo, margravine of Austria (d. 1071)
 Harald Hardrada, king of Norway (d. 1066)
 Herman IV, duke of Swabia (approximate date)
 John Komnenos, Byzantine aristocrat (d. 1067)
 Michael V Kalaphates, Byzantine emperor (d. 1042)
 Otto II, margrave of Montferrat (approximate date)
 Robert Guiscard, Norman nobleman (d. 1085)
 Roger de Beaumont, Norman nobleman (d. 1094)

Deaths 
 February 5 – Adelaide, German abbess and saint
 February 13 – Gilbert of Meaux, French bishop
 July 15 – Vladimir the Great, Grand Prince of Kiev
 September 1 – Gero II, margrave of the Saxon Ostmark
 September 12 – Lambert I, count of Louvain (b. 950)
 December 14 – Arduin of Ivrea, king of Italy (b. 955)
 December 20 – Eido I, bishop of Meissen (b. 955)
 date unknown
 Æthelmær the Stout, English ealdorman
 Al-Sharif al-Radi, Persian Shi'ite scholar (b. 970)
 Gavril Radomir, emperor (tsar) of Bulgaria
 Geoffrey (or Godfrey), count of Eu (b. 962)
 Herbert III, count of Vermandois (b. 953)
 Hugh III, count of Maine (approximate date)
 Ibn Furak, Muslim imam and theologian (b. 941)
 Irene of Larissa, empress (tsarina) of Bulgaria
 Liu Zong, Chinese official of the Song Dynasty
 Masawaih al-Mardini, Syrian physician and writer
 Morcar (or Morkere), English minister (thegn)
 Owain ap Dyfnwal, king of Strathclyde (Scotland)
 Rodulf of Ivry, Norman nobleman (approximate date)
 Sigeferth (or Sigefrith), English chief minister
 Vikramaditya V, Indian ruler of the Chalukya Empire

References

Sources